Tornabea is a monotypic genus of lichenized fungi in the family Physciaceae.
It only contains the one accepted species, Tornabea scutellifera 

2 other species has been found to be synonyms of Tornabea scutellifera; Tornabea atlantica  and Tornabea atlantica var. intricata 

The genus was circumscribed by Haavard Østhagen in Taxon vol.29 on pages 687-688 in 1980.

The genus name of Tornabea is in honour of Francesco Tornabene  (1813–1897), who was an Italian Benedictine Monk and botanist. At Montecassino Abbey, he was Professor of Botany, as well as founder and Director of the Botanical Garden in Catania between 1847 - 1892.

References

Caliciales
Lichen genera
Caliciales genera
Taxa described in 1980